Cautivo is the 12th studio album recorded by Puerto Rican performer Chayanne. It was released by Sony BMG Norte and Columbia Records on September 27, 2005 (see 2005 in music). This album became his third number-one set on the Billboard Top Latin Albums, and includes the singles "No Te Preocupes Por Mí", "Te Echo de Menos", "Cúrame" and "No Sé Por Qué".

Album history
This album was produced by René L. Toledo, Joel Someillán, Carlos Ponce, Freddy Piñero, Jr., Gustavo Arenas, Carlos Alberto de Yarza, Javier Díaz, John M. Falcone and was released by Sony BMG Norte and Columbia Records in late September 2005 on three formats: standard, enhanced (with bonus materials) and DualDisc (including the same track listing and bonus materials). It debuted at number one in the Billboard Top Latin Albums chart, replacing Fijación Oral Vol. 1 by Shakira and being replaced one week later by Más Capaces que Nunca by K-Paz de la Sierra.

From this album three singles were released, "No Te Preocupes Por Mí", the lead single which peaked at number 6 on the Billboard Hot Latin Tracks, "Te Echo de Menos" and "No Sé Por Qué", reaching number 15 and 16 on the same chart, respectively.

At the Latin Grammy Awards of 2006 Cautivo received two nominations, Album of the Year and Best Male Pop Vocal Album, winning none.

Track listing
The track listing from Billboard.com

Music videos
 "No Te Preocupes Por Mí"
 "Te Echo De Menos"
 "No Sé Por Qué"

Personnel

Carlos Álvarez - mezcla
Gustavo Arenas - arranger, keyboards, producer, programming
Carlos Bedoya - engineer
Manny Benito - vocal director
Richard Bravo - percussion
Ed Calle - saxophone
Jorge Casas - bajos
Huifang Chen - violin
Angie Chirino - coros
Kurt Coble - violin
Michael "Junno" Cosculluela - coros
Javier Díaz - producer
John DiPuccio - violin
Chris Glansdorp - cello
Jim Hacker - trumpet
Femio Hernández - production assistant
Julio Hernández - bajo sexto
Dina Kostic - violin
John Kricker - trombone
Manny López - acoustic guitar, electric guitar
Juan Cristobal Losada - engineer
Ricardo Eddy Martínez - arranger, bajo sexto
Patricia Masterson - engineer, production assistant
Alfredo Oliva - director, violin
Archie Peña - percussion
Clay Perry - arranger, piano
Rachel Perry -	coros
Freddy Piñero, Jr. - arranger, coros, engineer, mixing, producer
Carlos Ponce - producer
Lilly Ponce - coros
John "4 Daddman" Robinson - drums
Cesar Sogbe - engineer
Joel Someillan - coros, keyboards, Hammond organ, producer, programming
Rene Toledo - arranger, guitar, producer
Dan Warner - guitar
Woody Woodruff - engineer

Chart performance

Sales and certifications

References

2005 albums
Chayanne albums
Spanish-language albums
Sony BMG Norte albums
Columbia Records albums